Oleg Mishukov (born 31 August 1980) is a Russian sprinter. He competed in the men's 400 metres at the 2004 Summer Olympics. He also won a silver medal in the 4 x 400 m relay at the 2002 European Athletics Championships.

References

1980 births
Living people
Athletes (track and field) at the 2004 Summer Olympics
Russian male sprinters
Olympic athletes of Russia
Place of birth missing (living people)